Şehzade Mustafa (Ottoman Turkish: شهزاده مصطفى; 6 August 1515 – 6 October 1553) was an Ottoman prince and the son of Sultan Suleiman the Magnificent and his concubine Mahidevran Hatun. He was the governor of Manisa from 1532 to 1542, of Amasya from 1542 to 1549, and of Konya from 1549 to 1553, when he was executed by his father's order.

Life 

Şehzade Mustafa was born on 6 August 1515 in Manisa to Şehzade Suleiman (the future sultan) and Mahidevran Hatun.

Mustafa's relationship with his father was problematic. Though he was the first of Suleiman's sons to survive childhood and the most likely heir, his father preferred Mustafa's younger half-brother, Şehzade Mehmed, the eldest son of Hürrem Sultan, Suleiman's beloved chief consort (Haseki Sultan) and later legal wife.

It is difficult to discern what sort of relationship Mustafa had with his half-brothers Mehmed (born 1521), Selim (born 1524), Bayezid (born 1525), and Cihangir (born 1531). While it is true that Selim treated Mahidevran like his own mother by giving her back her wealth and helping to build Mustafa's türbe in Bursa, Mustafa was raised primarily apart from his half-brothers having left for his sanjak with his mother when they were still young. This, along with the rules of fratricide, would have made it difficult for them to have a close relationship. So the true scale of their relationship is not completely known.

In 1541, he faced a shock after being sent to Amasya from the more prominent Manisa; the rule of Manisa was given to Mehmed, while Şehzade Selim and Şehzade Bayezid were sent to Konya and Kütahya for their sanjak assignments. However, after he was sent to Amasya, Mustafa got the news of an edict written by Suleiman: Suleiman had sent him to Amasya to defend the eastern part of Anatolia and learn how to manage a large empire, not because Suleiman did not want him to be his heir,. The edict's message relieved the Ottoman army and the people of Anatolia, as Şehzade Mustafa was the popular successor to the throne.

During his time in Amasya, Mustafa got the news of the death of his brother Mehmed on 6 November 1543. It seemed like all barriers between the throne and Mustafa were gone, but he still faced another challenge. Selim was sent from Konya to Manisa in 1544, while Şehzade Bayezid remained in Kütahya. It was a critical decision, as they were Hürrem's sons. Hürrem's support of her own sons made Mustafa's political career difficult, but he successfully ruled Amasya for 8 years.

In 1547, during Suleiman's Elkas Campaign, the sultan met with his sons Selim, Bayezid, and Mustafa in different locations to discuss the political situation. It was well after the death of Mehmed, but the competition between the three princes was still going on.

In 1549, as a reward for his excellent participation in the Ottoman-Safavid War, Mustafa moved to Konya for his sanjak assignment. The rumours and speculations say that Mustafa's life was now in danger, as Hürrem and Rüstem Pasha had made a court alliance against him in favor of Hürrem's sons, Selim and Bayezid.

Execution 

During Suleiman's Persian campaign, his army halted in Ereğli for a while. While Suleiman's army was in Ereğli, Rüstem Pasha made an offer to Mustafa to join his father's army. At the same time, he warned Suleiman and persuaded him that Mustafa was coming to kill him.

Mustafa accepted Rüstem Pasha's offer and assembled his army to join his father's. Suleiman saw this as a threat and ordered the execution of his son. When Mustafa entered his father's tent to meet with him, Suleiman's guards attacked Mustafa. After a long struggle Mustafa was killed by Mahmut Ağa, Rüstem Pasha's right hand.

Reaction
After the death of the prince, the Janissaries and Anatolian soldiers of Mustafa rebelled against Suleiman's decision. The Janissaries supported Mustafa because of Ottoman traditions about succession and the success of Mustafa as a warrior.

The people blamed Suleiman's wife Hürrem and his son-in-law Rüstem, and even the Sultan himself for this unfair execution. After the protests of the army, Suleiman dismissed Rüstem from his position as grand vizier and sent him back to Istanbul. Hürrem is usually held at least partly responsible for the intrigues in nominating a successor to the throne, though there is no evidence to support this.

Funeral
Suleiman ordered that Mustafa be given a state funeral in Istanbul. After a week lying in state at Hagia Sophia, Mustafa was laid to rest in a large mausoleum in Bursa. Mustafa's execution caused unrest in Anatolia, especially in Amasya, Manisa and Konya, because the people saw him as the next sultan and because of his generosity and bravery. The poet Taşlıcalı Yahya composed an elegy for the dead prince. His story was similar to the story of Sultan Cem.

Family
His only known consort was of Crimean origin and born in 1525, though her name is not known. It is also not certain which of his four children she gave birth to. After Mustafa's death, she may have married Pertev Mehmed Pasha.

Sons
Mustafa had at least two sons. All his sons alive at the time of his death were executed as him by Suleiman the Magnificent. 
Şehzade Mehmed (1546, Amasya - 1553/1554, Bursa).
Şehzade Ahmed (?, Amasya - 1553?, Konya).

Daughters
Mustafa had at least two daughters: 
Nergisşah Sultan (1536 - 1592). She married Cenâbî Ahmed Paşa and was widowed in 1562. Her husband was Governor of Kütahya for 20 years.
Şah Sultan ( 1547, Konya – 2 November 1577). She married Abdülkerim Ağa, Janissaries' general, between 1562 and 1567.

Depictions in literature and popular culture 
 
In 1561, eight years after Mustafa's death, the French author Gabriel Bounin wrote a tragedy titled La Soltane about the role of Hürrem Sultan in Mustafa's death. This tragedy marks the first time the Ottomans were introduced on stage in France. In 1739 a British play Mustapha by David Mallet was performed at Drury Lane.

In the television series Muhteşem Yüzyıl, Mustafa is played by Turkish actor Mehmet Günsür.

Mustafa's life and execution are depicted in the 2022 film Three Thousand Years of Longing, where he is played by Matteo Boccelli, son of singer Andrea Boccelli.

References

External links

1515 births
1553 deaths
16th-century people from the Ottoman Empire
Suleiman the Magnificent
Executed people from the Ottoman Empire
Ottoman princes
People from Manisa
16th-century executions by the Ottoman Empire
Executed royalty
Turks from the Ottoman Empire
Heirs apparent who never acceded